This list of cannabis competitions is an index to articles about notable competitions related to cannabis. Many are part of a larger cannabis festival and two are part of a state fair.

Australia and New Zealand
Australian Cannabis Awards
Nimbin MardiGrass cannabis cup

Jamaica
The annual Jamaican Cannabis Festival (Montego Bay 2014-). Best/strongest strains awarded as well as an introduction to new developments.

Canada
Prairie Harvest Medicinal Marijuana Cup (Saskatoon, 2011–)
Tokers Bowl (Vancouver 2002–2005)
Toronto Cannabis Cup
Winnipeg Cannabis Cup (2016–)

United States 

The WEEDYS Awards
Best Bud, D.C. State Fair (2015–)
Cannabis Cup
Cultivation Classic, sun-grown craft cannabis competition (Portland, Oregon 2016–) and according to Rolling Stone, "the first cannabis flower cup in the world to analyze terpenes and minor cannabinoids of every organic flower sample contending for the award"
Sticky Icky Carolina Cup & Title Belt Asheville NC 4/20
Dope Cup
Emerald Cup
High Times Medical Cannabis Cup
Northwest Cannabis Classic (Anchorage, Portland, Tacoma, 2015–) "a cannabis award show where we have these really awesome trophies that we award to the winners of best indica, best sativa, best hybrid, best concentrate and best edible"
Oregon Cannabis Growers' Fair at the Oregon State Fair
Stony Awards
The Grow-Off

References

Competition